Josh Stuart (born 20 December 1972) is an Australian former professional rugby league footballer who played for the North Sydney Bears and Northern Eagles in the National Rugby League.

Early life
Stuart grew up in Sydney, attending St Paul's College, Manly, during which time he was chosen to represent the Australian Schoolboys team in both 1990 and 1991.

Playing career
A prop, he started his first-grade career at North Sydney in 1993, going on to make 111 appearances, including six finals.  Following round 10 of the 1998 NRL season, Stuart was suspended for 12 matches due to two high tackles.

Stuart played in North Sydney's final ever match as a first grade side which Norths won against North Queensland by a score of 28–18 in Townsville.

When North Sydney merged with Manly to form the Northern Eagles, he spent two seasons with the new club, playing 22 first-grade games before retiring after the 2001 season.

At representative level, Stuart played for NSW City in the 1997 City vs Country Origin match.

He is the brother-in-law of former players Ivan Cleary and Jason Death, who are married to his sisters Rebecca and Yvette respectively.

References

External links

Josh Stuart at Rugby League project

1972 births
Living people
Australian rugby league players
Rugby league players from Sydney
Rugby league props
North Sydney Bears players
Northern Eagles players
New South Wales City Origin rugby league team players